The 2010–11 Professional Arena Soccer League (PASL-Pro) season is the third season for the American arena soccer league. The season kicked off on Friday November 12, when the Louisville Lightning hosted the Cincinnati Kings. A new feature for the 2010–11 season was the Frontier Division. The Frontier Division featured teams above the level of PASL-Premier but not ready for the higher travel demands and costs of the PASL-Pro. Frontier teams played an abbreviated 12-game schedule, with a mixture of PASL-Pro, PASL-Premier, and other Frontier Division opponents. The 2010–2011 PASL playoffs were held in the Cincinnati Gardens, home of the newly rechristened Cincinnati Kings.

Standings
As of March 12, 2011

(Bold Division Winner)

PASL Wild Card play-in match
Frontier Division Winner vs. Potential Wild Card Team

Fri.Mar.4,9:30 pm ET: Detroit Waza 8, Illinois Piasa 2

Wild Card qualifier Tacoma advances due to Illinois' loss

2011 PASL-Pro North American Finals (Cincinnati, OH)
La Raza de Guadalajara qualifies as LMFR Champion
PPM Sidekicks del Estado de Mexico qualify as LMFR Runner-Up
Cincinnati Kings qualify as East Division Champion
San Diego Sockers qualify as West Division Champion
Calgary United qualify as CMISL Champion
Tacoma Stars qualify as PASL Wild Card

Thu. March 10, 2011 Quarterfinals
Quarterfinal A – 6:30 pm – La Raza de Guadalajara 9, Tacoma Stars 6
Quarterfinal B – 9:00 pm – PPM Sidekicks del Estado de Mexico 10, Calgary United FC 2

Fri. March 11, 2011 Semifinals
Semifinal A – 6:30 pm – San Diego Sockers 7, PPM Sidekicks del Estado de Mexico 3
Semifinal B – 9:00 pm – La Raza de Guadalajara 11, Cincinnati Kings 7

Sat. March 12, 2011 Finals
7:35 pm – San Diego Sockers 10, La Raza de Guadalajara 6

Awards

All-League First Team

All-League Second Team

References

External links
 PASL-Pro official website

 
Professional Arena Soccer League
Professional Arena Soccer League
Professional Arena Soccer League seasons